Tom Jefferson is a British epidemiologist, based in Rome, Italy, who works for the Cochrane Collaboration. Jefferson is an author and editor of the Cochrane Collaboration's acute respiratory infections group, as well as part of four other Cochrane groups. He was also an advisor to the Italian National Agency for Regional Health Services. 

In 1999, Jefferson was one of the founding members of the Brighton Collaboration along with Harald Heijbel, Ulrich Heininger, Robert Chen, and Elisabeth Loupi. He has worked on Cochrane reviews examining the effectiveness of the anti-viral oseltamivir and the influenza vaccine.

Notable work
In 2009, Jefferson was hired by the governments of Britain and Australia to update a systematic review of oseltamivir. Initially he had a great deal of trouble getting results of the original trials. Previous researchers had published trials without seeing the underlying data and it appeared that some of the published papers used ghost writers. As the company, Roche, that did the trials refused to provide data for independent analysis, their conclusions in 2009 were that benefits could not be shown.

In 2011, Jefferson's team was provided 22,000 pages of data from the European Medicines Agency and Roche eventually provided 3,000 pages of data. In 2012, Jefferson was the lead author of another Cochrane review of this data which concluded that oseltamivir did not reduce the number of hospitalizations caused by influenza. Jefferson said that this review also found no evidence that oseltamivir stopped complications from the disease. The review is considered a landmark and is posted on the James Lind Library website which illustrates the development of fair tests of healthcare.

Jefferson is the lead author of a suite of Cochrane reviews on antivirals, influenza vaccines and physical interventions to interrupt the spread of acute respiratory infections. The reviews are either kept up to date or stabilized, meaning no new evidence is likely to become available. The earliest review date from 1996 and the latest is the fourth update of the physical interventions review (2020, currently undergoing its fifth update).

Jefferson has also reviewed the evidence of effects of editorial and grant giving peer review and co-written several reviews and topics on this subject. Currently he is assessing the evidence of transmission of SARS-CoV-2 and other respiratory pathogens and is co-editor of the Substack publication website Trust The Evidence. In his latest publication Jefferson and his fellows have concluded the presence of replication-competent SARS-CoV-2 on fomites, using evidence from viral culture studies.

A list of his publications and contributions is available on his personal website.

Publications

References

External links
Official website

British epidemiologists
20th-century births
Year of birth missing (living people)
Living people
Cochrane Collaboration people